Nicolas Caraux (born 4 March 1991) is a French professional football goalkeeper who currently plays for FC Versailles 78.

Career
Caraux came through the youth academy at RC Lens, before joining the Edusport Academy in Motherwell in 2012.

Nicolas signed with Scottish Championship side Greenock Morton in July 2013. He made his first competitive debut in a 1–0 defeat in the Scottish Challenge Cup to Annan Athletic.

In September 2013, he signed a contract extension until summer 2015. He was released by Morton in May 2015.

After a year without a club he signed for ACBB. He then played two league for Versailles, before moving to the United States.

On 6 February 2018, Caraux joined Atlanta United 2 of the United Soccer League.

See also
 Greenock Morton F.C. season 2013-14 | 2014-15

References

External links
 
 
 

1991 births
Living people
Association football goalkeepers
French footballers
French expatriate sportspeople in Scotland
Greenock Morton F.C. players
RC Lens players
Atlanta United 2 players
Sportspeople from Versailles, Yvelines
Expatriate footballers in Scotland
French expatriate footballers
Scottish Professional Football League players
Caledonian Braves F.C. players
USL Championship players
Footballers from Yvelines